Hesperonemastoma is a genus of harvestmen in the family Taracidae. There are about five described species in Hesperonemastoma.

Species
These five species belong to the genus Hesperonemastoma:
 Hesperonemastoma kepharti (Crosby & Bishop, 1924)
 Hesperonemastoma modestum (Banks, 1894)
 Hesperonemastoma packardi (Roewer, 1914)
 Hesperonemastoma pallidimaculosum (C.J. Goodnight & M.L. Goodnight, 1945)
 Hesperonemastoma smilax Shear, 2010

References

Harvestmen
Articles created by Qbugbot